Anita Desai, born Anita Mazumdar (born 24 June 1937) is an Indian novelist and the Emerita John E. Burchard Professor of Humanities at the Massachusetts Institute of Technology. As a writer she has been shortlisted for the Booker Prize three times. She received a Sahitya Akademi Award in 1978 for her novel Fire on the Mountain, from the Sahitya Akademi, India's National Academy of Letters. She won the British Guardian Prize for The Village by the Sea. The Peacock, Voices in the City, Fire on the Mountain and an anthology of short stories, Games at Twilight. She is on the advisory board of the Lalit Kala Akademi and a Fellow of the Royal Society of Literature, London.

Early life
Desai was born in 1937 in Mussoorie, India, to a German immigrant mother, Toni Nime, and a Bengali businessman, D. N. Mazumdar. Her Bengali father first met her German mother while he was an engineering student in pre-war Berlin; and they got married during a period when it was still unusual for an Indian man to marry a European woman. Shortly after their marriage, they moved to New Delhi, where Desai was raised with her two elder sisters and brother.

She grew up speaking Hindi with her neighbours, and only German at her home. She also spoke Bengali, Urdu and English out of her house. She first learned to read and write in English at school and as a result, English became her "literary language". She began to write in English at the age of seven and published her first story at the age of nine.

She was a student at Queen Mary's Higher Secondary School in Delhi and received her B.A. in English literature in 1957 from the Miranda House of the University of Delhi. The following year she married Ashvin Desai, the director of a computer software company and author of the book Between Eternities: Ideas on Life and The Cosmos.

They have four children, including Booker Prize-winning novelist Kiran Desai. Her children were taken to Thul (near Alibagh) for weekends, where Desai set her novel The Village by the Sea. For that work she won the 1983 Guardian Children's Fiction Prize, a once-in-a-lifetime book award judged by a panel of British children's writers.

Career
Desai published her first novel, Cry The Peacock, in 1963. In 1958 she collaborated with P. Lal and founded the publishing firm Writers Workshop. She considers Clear Light of Day (1980) her most autobiographical work as it is set during her coming of age and also in the same neighborhood in which she grew up.

In 1984, she published In Custody – about an Urdu poet in his declining days – which was shortlisted for the Booker Prize. In 1993, she became a creative writing teacher at Massachusetts Institute of Technology.

The 1999 Booker Prize finalist novel Fasting, Feasting increased her popularity. Her novel The Zigzag Way, set in 20th-century Mexico, appeared in 2004 and her latest collection of short stories, The Artist of Disappearance, was published in 2011.

Desai has taught at Mount Holyoke College, Baruch College, and Smith College. She is a Fellow of the Royal Society of Literature, the American Academy of Arts and Letters, and of Girton College, Cambridge (to which she dedicated Baumgartner's Bombay).

Film
In 1993, her novel In Custody was adapted by Merchant Ivory Productions into an English film by the same name, directed by Ismail Merchant, with a screenplay by Shahrukh Husain. It won the 1994 President of India Gold Medal for Best Picture and stars Shashi Kapoor, Shabana Azmi and Om Puri.

Awards
 1978 – Winifred Holtby Memorial Prize – Fire on the Mountain
 1978 – Sahitya Akademi Award (National Academy of Letters Award) – Fire on the Mountain
 1980 – Shortlisted, Booker Prize for Fiction – Clear Light of Day
 1983 – Guardian Children's Fiction Prize – The Village by the Sea: an Indian family story
 1984 – Shortlisted, Booker Prize for Fiction – In Custody
 1993 – Neil Gunn Prize
 1999 – Shortlisted, Booker Prize for Fiction: Fasting, Feasting
 2000 – Alberto Moravia Prize for Literature (Italy)
 2003 – Benson Medal of Royal Society of Literature
 2007 – Sahitya Akademi Fellowship
 2014 – Padma Bhushan

Selected works 
 Cry, The Peacock (1963) Orient Paperbacks 
 Voices in the City (1965), Orient Paperbacks 
 Bye-bye Blackbird (1971), Orient Paperbacks 
 The Peacock Garden (1974), Mammoth Books 
 Where Shall We Go This Summer? (1975), Orient Paperbacks 
 Cat on a Houseboat (1976), Orient Longman 
 Fire on the Mountain (1977), Random House India 
 Games at Twilight (1978), Vintage Publishing 
 Clear Light of Day (1980), Random House India 
 The Village by the Sea (1982), Penguin India 
 In Custody (1984) 
 Baumgartner's Bombay (1988)
 Journey to Ithaca (1995), Random House India 
 Scholar and Gipsey (1996), Weidenfeld & Nicolson 
 Fasting, Feasting (1999), Random House India 
 Diamond Dust and Other Stories (2000), Vintage Books 
 The Zigzag Way (2004), Random House India 
 The Artist of Disappearance (2011), Mariner Books

See also
 
 Indian English literature
 List of Indian writers

References

Sources
 Abrams, M. H. and Stephen Greenblatt. "Anita Desai". The Norton Anthology of English Literature, Vol. 2C, 7th Edition. New York: W.W. Norton, 2000: 2768 – 2785.
 Alter, Stephen and Wimal Dissanayake. "A Devoted Son by Anita Desai". The Penguin Book of Modern Indian Short Stories. New Delhi, Middlesex, New York: Penguin Books, 1991: 92–101.
 Gupta, Indra. India's 50 Most Illustrious Women.
 Selvadurai, Shyam (ed.). "Anita Desai:Winterscape". Story-Wallah: A Celebration of South Asian Fiction. New York: Houghton Mifflin, 2005:69–90.
Nawale, Arvind M. (ed.).  "Anita Desai's Fiction: Themes and Techniques". New Delhi: B. R. Publishing Corporation, 2011.

External links
 
 Anita Desai discusses Fasting, Feasting on the BBC World Book Club
 Voices from the Gaps
 SAWNET bio
 MIT page
 Revisiting Anita Desai's "In Custody" for the Agrégation-Relire "Un héritage exorbitant" d'A. Desai
 

Interviews
 Jabberwock: a conversation with Anita Desai
 

Papers
Anita Desai Collection at the Harry Ransom Humanities Research Center at the University of Texas at Austin
 Books written by Anita Desai

1937 births
Living people
Bengali Hindus
21st-century American women writers
MIT School of Humanities, Arts, and Social Sciences faculty
Mount Holyoke College faculty
Indian emigrants to the United States
Fellows of Girton College, Cambridge
Delhi University alumni
American novelists of Indian descent
American women novelists
American women writers of Indian descent
Guardian Children's Fiction Prize winners
Fellows of the Royal Society of Literature
Recipients of the Padma Shri in literature & education
Recipients of the Sahitya Akademi Award in English
English-language writers from India
Indian people of German descent
Smith College faculty
20th-century American novelists
21st-century American novelists
Recipients of the Sahitya Akademi Fellowship
Recipients of the Padma Bhushan in literature & education
20th-century American women writers
Novelists from Uttarakhand
People from Mussoorie
21st-century Indian women writers
21st-century Indian writers
21st-century Indian novelists
20th-century Indian women writers
20th-century Indian novelists
Women writers from Uttarakhand
20th-century Indian dramatists and playwrights
Indian women screenwriters
Screenwriters from Uttarakhand
PEN/Faulkner Award for Fiction winners
Novelists from Massachusetts
American women academics